The Dying Gaul, also called The Dying Galatian or The Dying Gladiator, is an ancient Roman marble semi-recumbent statue now in the Capitoline Museums in Rome. It is a copy of a now lost sculpture from the Hellenistic period (323-31 BC) thought to have been made in bronze. The original may have been commissioned at some time between 230 and 220 BC by Attalus I of Pergamon to celebrate his victory over the Galatians, the Celtic or Gaulish people of parts of Anatolia. The original sculptor is believed to have been Epigonus, a court sculptor of the Attalid dynasty of Pergamon.

Until the 20th century the marble statue was usually known as The Dying Gladiator, on the assumption that it depicted a wounded gladiator in a Roman amphitheatre. However, in the mid-19th century it was  re-identified as a Gaul or Galatian and the present name "Dying Gaul" gradually achieved popular acceptance. The identification as a "barbarian" was evidenced for the figure's torc, thick hair and moustache, weapons and shield carved on the floor, and a type of Gallic carnyx between his legs.

Description
The white marble statue, which may originally have been painted, depicts a wounded, slumped Gaulish or Galatian Celt, shown with remarkable realism and pathos, particularly as regards the face. A bleeding sword puncture is visible in his lower right chest. The warrior is represented with characteristic Celtic hairstyle and moustache with a Celtic torc around his neck. He sits on his shield while his sword, belt and curved trumpet lie beside him. The sword hilt bears a lion's head. The present base is a 17th-century addition. The nose and left arm restorations upon the discovery of the statue in the 17th century are contested (the right arm would be pushed even more behind his back).

Discovery and expatriation

The Dying Gaul statue is thought to have been re-discovered in the early 17th century during excavations for the building of the Villa Ludovisi (commissioned by Cardinal Ludovico Ludovisi, nephew of Pope Gregory XV), on the site of the ancient Gardens of Sallust on the Pincian Hill in Rome. Many other antiquities (most notably the "Ludovisi Throne") were subsequently discovered on the site in the late 19th century when the Ludovisi's estate was redeveloped and built over. The Dying Gaul was first recorded in a 1623 inventory of the collections of the Ludovisi family and in 1633 was in the Palazzo Grande, part of the Villa Ludovisi. Pope Clement XII (ruled 1730–1740) acquired it for the Capitoline collections. It was later taken by Napoleon's forces under the terms of the Treaty of Tolentino and was displayed with other Italian works of art in the Louvre Museum until 1816 when it was returned to Rome.

Portrayal of Celts

The statue serves both as a reminder of the Celts' defeat, thus demonstrating the might of the people who defeated them, and a memorial to their bravery as worthy adversaries. The statue may also provide evidence to corroborate ancient accounts of the fighting style—Diodorus Siculus reported that "Some of them have iron breastplates or chainmail while others fight naked". Polybius wrote an evocative account of Galatian tactics against a Roman army at the Battle of Telamon of 225 BC:

The Roman historian Livy recorded that the Celts of Asia Minor fought naked and their wounds were plain to see on the whiteness of their bodies. The Greek historian Dionysius of Halicarnassus regarded this as a foolish tactic:

The depiction of this particular Galatian as naked may also have been intended to lend him the dignity of heroic nudity or pathetic nudity. It was not infrequent for Greek warriors to be likewise depicted as heroic nudes, as exemplified by the pedimental sculptures of the Temple of Aphaea at Aegina. The message conveyed by the sculpture, as H. W. Janson comments, is that "they knew how to die, barbarians that they were".

Influence
The Dying Galatian became one of the most celebrated works to have survived from antiquity and was engraved and endlessly copied by artists, for whom it was a classic model for depiction of strong emotion, and by sculptors.  It shows signs of having been repaired, with the head seemingly having been broken off at the neck, though it is unclear whether the repairs were carried out in Roman times or after the statue's 17th-century rediscovery.  As discovered, the proper left leg was in three pieces.  They are now pinned together with the pin concealed by the left kneecap. The Gaul's "spiky" hair is a 17th-century reworking of longer hair found as broken upon discovery.

During this period, the statue was widely interpreted as representing a defeated gladiator, rather than a Galatian warrior. Hence it was known as the 'Dying' or 'Wounded Gladiator', 'Roman Gladiator', and 'Murmillo Dying'. It has also been called the 'Dying Trumpeter' because one of the scattered objects lying beside the figure is a horn.

The artistic quality and expressive pathos of the statue aroused great admiration among the educated classes in the 17th and 18th centuries and was a "must-see" sight on the Grand Tour of Europe undertaken by young men of the day.  Byron was one such visitor, commemorating the statue in his poem Childe Harold's Pilgrimage:
 

It was widely copied, with kings, academics and wealthy landowners commissioning their own reproductions of the Dying Gaul. Thomas Jefferson wanted the original or a reproduction at Monticello. The less well-off could purchase copies of the statue in miniature for use as ornaments and paperweights.  Full-size plaster copies were also studied by art students.

It was requisitioned by Napoleon Bonaparte by terms of the Treaty of Campoformio (1797) during his invasion of Italy and taken in triumph to Paris, where it was put on display. The piece was returned to Rome in 1816. From December 12, 2013, until March 16, 2014, the work was on display in the main rotunda of the west wing of the National Gallery of Art in Washington D.C.  This temporary tenure marked the first time the antiquity had left Italy since it was returned in the second decade of the nineteenth century.

Copies

Copies of the statue (itself a copy) can be seen in the Museum of Classical Archaeology at Cambridge University, Leinster House in Dublin, Ireland, Ørstedsparken in Copenhagen, Denmark, as well as in Berlin, Prague, Stockholm, Versailles, Warsaw (Royal Baths Park).

In the United States, copies are at the Washington State Historical Society in Tacoma, Washington, at the Redwood Library, Newport, Rhode Island, and at Assumption College in Worcester, MA.

A copy in bronze titled "Centurion" stands in front of the Mel Bailey Criminal Justice Center in Birmingham, Alabama, as a memorial to the lives of fallen police officers; this copy wears a pteruges but is otherwise identical.

The Royal Academy in London had one such copy, now at the Courtauld Gallery in London. It also had an écorché in this pose, cast in the late 18th century from the body of an executed smuggler and hence nicknamed "Smugglerius".

There is an example in bronze over the gate of the walled garden at Iford Manor, Wiltshire, England. In the English market town of Brigg in Lincolnshire, the long established coaching inn The Dying Gladiator displays a copy, using the old title.

The College of Fine Arts in the University of the Philippines Diliman also has a copy, using the old title. There is also a copy at the Hermitage Museum in St Petersburg, Russia. and one in the Telfair Museum of Art Savannah, Georgia.

The Museum of Art and Circus Museum, Ringling Brothers Estate, Sarasota, Florida has a full-size copy.

The William Humphreys Art Gallery in South Africa, situated in Kimberley also  has a copy.

The residence of the Ambassador of France to Cuba located in the Miramar suburb of Havana has a copy at the rear of the garden behind the residence.

The Pinacoteca in São Paulo, Brazil, has a bronze copy.

Notes

Further reading
 Art in the Hellenistic Age, Pollitt, J. J., 1986
 Hellenistic Sculpture, Smith, R.R.R. London, 1991
 Taste and the Antique, Haskell, F. and N. Penny. New Haven and London, 1981. Cat. no. 44, pp 224ff.

External links

3rd-century BC works
Pergamene sculpture
Sculptures in the Capitoline Museums
Antiquities acquired by Napoleon
Ludovisi collection
Roman copies of Greek sculptures
Marble sculptures
War art
Nude sculptures
Archaeological discoveries in Italy